The Share Centre was an independent UK retail stockbroker based in Aylesbury, Buckinghamshire, England.

History
The Share Centre was founded by Gavin Oldham, formerly of Barclayshare (now Barclays Stockbrokers) in 1990. It was based in Aylesbury, Buckinghamshire. The Share Centre Limited operated as a subsidiary of Share Plc until the acquisition by interactive investor.

It was established to provide value-for-money share services for private investors. It was a member of the London Stock Exchange and regulated by the Financial Conduct Authority.

In February 2020, Interactive Investor announced its intention to acquire Share PLC (The parent company for The Share Centre). The acquisition was completed in July 2020. All The Share Centre customers affected by the move migrated to the ii platform between February 2021 and November 2021. From December 2021, the share.com website was closed to all web traffic and from this date were redirected to the interactive investor website.

Products
In Spring 1991, The Share Centre started as a retail broker offering self-select share dealing services to personal investors. Within 18 months, it secured contracts to provide white-labelled share dealing services for readers of the Mail on Sunday, The Guardian and a large regional newspaper group.

In 2000, it set up a holding company, ShareMark which was set up as an internal trading share platform when The Share Centre issued free shares to around 90,000 clients. It opened to other companies in 2002. By 2008, the company floated with a share offer that was four times oversubscribed. It now has more than 227,000 customers across the UK.

In May 2011, The Share Centre deployed a log management and security information and event management (SIEM) solution from LogRhythm. In May 2012, The Share Centre discarded T1PS Investment Management's Tom Winnifrith as manager of its two small-cap mandates in favour of former Unicorn founder Peter Webb. In May 2012, The Share Centre has appointed Rufus Leonard to overhaul its website.

In April 2015, Barclays Stockbrokers ceased offering certificated share dealing and transferred all customers requiring the service to The Share Centre. In July 2015, the retail stockbroker completed the integration of more than 11,000 Barclays’ customers.

The Share Center's range of services includes buying and selling shares and a comprehensive share administration and safe custody service. Tax-efficient investment 'wrappers' including ISAs, CTFs and SIPPs are also available. The Share Centre's Investment Research team provides comment on market sectors, individual shares and funds. It offers a full range of investment options including funds and has more than 265,000 accounts under its administration.

In August 2018, the Share Centre was selected by PWC, to take on an estimated 15000 former clients of the collapsed broker Beaufort Securities.

References

External links

Financial services companies established in 1990
1990 establishments in England
Privately held companies of England
Companies based in Buckinghamshire